School District 58 Nicola-Similkameen is a school district in British Columbia.This includes the major centres of Merritt and Princeton.

History
School District 58 Nicola-Similkameen was created by the merger of the Merritt and Princeton School districts. Prior to the merger Princeton was School District 17 and Merritt was School District #31.
Both the teachers' unions are employed by Nicola-Similkameen School district but have retained their original status within the British Columbia Teachers' Federation (BCTF).  The respective unions are: Nicola Valley Teachers' Union (NVTU) - Local #31 of the BCTF and Princeton District Teachers' Union (PDTU) - Local #17 of the BCTF.

Schools

See also
List of school districts in British Columbia

School districts in the Okanagan
58